Chuxiong may refer to:

 Chuxiong Yi Autonomous Prefecture (楚雄彝族自治州), in Yunnan, China
 Chuxiong City (楚雄市), prefecture seat of Chuxiong Yi Autonomous Prefecture, in Yunnan, China